The "Never war" monument is an antiwar statue located in the Żabikowo area of Luboń, Poland, on the site of a former German internment camp known as Poggenburg. The monument was designed and built by Józef Gosławski in 1955, using granite and sandstone. It was unveiled 4 November 1956 by General Zygmunt Berling.

The monument depicts a man embracing a woman and child. On the pedestal is an inscription: NEVER WAR (Polish: NIGDY WOJNY).

Gallery

Bibliography

External links 
 

Luboń
Monuments and memorials in Poland
Works by Józef Gosławski
Buildings and structures in Greater Poland Voivodeship